Sir Henry Edward Pollock, QC, JP (16 December 1864 – 2 February 1953) was an English barrister who became a prominent politician in Hong Kong. He acted as Attorney General in Hong Kong on several occasions, and was once appointed to the same post in Fiji. He also served as Senior Unofficial Member of both the Legislative Council and Executive Council for many years in pre-Pacific War Hong Kong. Along with Sir Paul Chater, then Governor Sir Frederick Lugard (later Lord Lugard) and others, Sir Henry was one of the founders of the University of Hong Kong.

Biography

Family background 

Pollock was born to a well-known family in the law. His grandfather, Sir Frederick Pollock, 1st Baronet served as Attorney General for England and Wales between 1834 and 1835 and 1841 and 1844 in the Tory administrations of Sir Robert Peel; one of his many cousins, Sir Frederick Pollock, 3rd Baronet was a renowned professor of jurisprudence in the University of Oxford; another cousin of Pollock, Ernest Pollock, 1st Viscount Hanworth, served as the Master of the Rolls from 1925 to 1935.

Pollock's father was Dr. Arthur Julius Pollock (7 February 1835 – 11 May 1890). He was the eldest son in the second marriage of Sir Frederick Pollock, though he ranked thirteenth among the twenty-four children that Sir Frederick had. Dr. Pollock was a physician and lecturer in the Foundling Hospital and Charing Cross Hospital. He was also a Council member of the Royal College of Physicians.

Pollock was the third child of his mother, Ellen Bailey (? – 25 October 1895). He had an elder sister, Caroline (4 August 1862 – ?), an elder brother, Arthur Julius (21 August 1863 – 28 May 1914), and a younger brother, Charles Frederick (17 July 1866 – 17 July 1919).

Early years 
Pollock was born in London, England on 16 December 1864. He spent his early childhood in London and was later admitted to the Charterhouse School. He quit the school in 1882 at the age of 18, and was promptly employed by a bank in Drury Lane. After one year of working, Pollock earned 50 pounds in total, and opted for continuing his study. He was successfully enrolled by the Inner Temple in 1883 and was called to the bar upon graduation in 1887.

In April 1888, seeking for new opportunities elsewhere, Pollock left his family and departed England for the then Crown Colony of Hong Kong. He was soon qualified as a barrister in Hong Kong, and set up his career in the legal profession.

Colonial life 
Pollock was substantially valued by the local society not long after his arrival to the colony. For six months from September 1888 to March 1889, he had been appointed by the government as acting Police Magistrate. In 1891, he was appointed unofficial Justice of Peace, and later in 1892, he had served as acting Puisne Judge for the government for half a year. In 1894, Hong Kong was suffered from a severe plague which caused thousands of deaths. Pollock was noted for his work on relief during the plague and was awarded a gold medal by the government afterwards.

From 1896 to 1901, Pollock was appointed by the government as acting Attorney General, and thus became an ex officio member of both the Legislative Council and Executive Council. During his tenure as both an Attorney General and a councillor, his performance was highly regarded by his colleagues, and he was appointed Queen's Counsel as a reward in 1900. In 1902, Pollock was posted to Fiji and served as Attorney General in there. Nevertheless, he did not stay long in Fiji and returned to Hong Kong a year later. A year in Fiji did not weaken his influence in Hong Kong: he went on to serve as a member of the Sanitary Board from March 1903 to February 1906.

Life as councillor 
In 1903, under the promotion of the Chamber of Commerce, Pollock had briefly served as acting Unofficial Member of the Legislative Council for around a year. Soon afterwards, he was again nominated by the unofficial Justices of Peace and became a full unofficial member of the council in December 1905. For nearly forty years, Pollock would continuously represent the unofficial Justices of Peace constituency in the council.

In his long tenure in the Legislative Council, Pollock was active in public service and served in a number of committees as member or chairman, including the Peace Celebration and War Memorial Finance Committee, Housing Commission and the Standing Law Committee. During the First World War, Pollock also sat as a Judge in the Appeal Tribunal; he was later reappointed for the same post on the outbreak of the Second World War in 1939.

As early as 1911 and 1912, Pollock was provisionally appointed twice as unofficial member of the Executive Council. However, he lost the chance to be appointed a full unofficial member in November 1915 when he unsuccessfully pressured the then governor, Sir Henry May in a Legislative Council meeting for replacing a vacancy for an unofficial member in the Executive Council through limited election.

Pollock was one of the most prominent activists on constitutional reform in pre-war Hong Kong. He did not give up after his request was abruptly turned down by Sir Henry. In January 1916, he sent a petition compiled with a few hundreds signatures to the Secretary of State for the Colonies, Bonar Law, and called for reform in both the Legislative and Executive Council. According to his proposal, he suggested that more unofficial seats should be created on the two councils. These new seats should be elected by members of the Chamber of Commerce and the unofficial Justices of Peace to let them be more fully represented. Also, Pollock supported the appointment of more Chinese to the two councils.

Pollock's proposal was also rejected by Bonar Law with no reason given. The relationship between Pollock and Sir Henry, was so badly damaged that Pollock was never again chosen to sit on the Executive Council during the governorship of Sir Henry. Pollock only became an unofficial member of the Executive Council after the retirement of Sir Henry, when his successor, Sir Reginald Stubbs, appointed him in 1921. Three years later, Pollock was appointed a Knight Bachelor in the King's Birthday Honours in 1924.

Pollock was appointed acting Attorney-General for three times in 1919, 1925 and 1928 respectively. In his capacity as acting Attorney-General, he sat in the two councils as ex officio member rather than unofficial member, and his unofficial seats in the Legislative Council was provisionally elected by his fellow Justices of Peace. In 1917, he succeeded Sir Boshan Wei Yuk as Senior Unofficial Member of the Legislative Council; later in 1926, he also became Senior Unofficial Member of the Executive Council after the death Sir Paul Chater, and therefore became the Senior Member of both two councils. Nevertheless, on 16 September 1928, Pollock had an accidental fall in his home at No. 367, the Peak. He broke his thigh heavily and could not assume his duties in the councils. As a result, another member of the Legislative and the Executive Council, Sir Shouson Chow, temporarily replaced him as Senior Member during his incapacity. Pollock recovered from the fall in December and reassumed his duties again.

Besides his duties in the two councils, Pollock had served as chairman of the Hong Kong Branch of the Navy League, the Chess Club, the Society for the Prevention of Cruelty to Animals and the Constitutional Reform Association. He had also served as Commodore of the Royal Hong Kong Yacht Club, Secretary of the Odd Volumes Society and corresponding secretary to the Royal Colonial Institute.

Pollock was instrumental to the establishment of the University of Hong Kong as he was one of the founders of the University. Pollock was originally a member of the council of the Hong Kong College of Medicine for Chinese. In March 1908, along with Sir Paul Chater, Sir Kai Ho-Kai and a few other people, Pollock was appointed to the newly founded organising committee of the University of Hong Kong which was chaired by Sir Paul Chater by then governor Sir Frederick Lugard (later Lord Lugard). When the University of Hong Kong was officially founded in 1911, Pollock was appointed a life member of the University Court. Pollock was said to be an active member who frequently attend the Court's meetings, and was noted for his enthusiasm towards the development of the University. In acknowledging his contribution, he received Honorary Doctorates of Law from the University on 5 January 1925.

Pollock had close ties with St. Stephen's College as he was one of the guests invited to the foundation stone-laying ceremony of the College's new school site in Stanley in 1928. Furthermore, in 1933, under the assistance from him and Sir Robert Kotewall, the student-actors and student-actresses of the College were allowed to play on the same stage in a fundraising drama event regardless the opposition from the conservative Chinese community.

Final years 
On 17 January 1940 and in the beginning of 1941, Pollock was appointed unofficial member of the Legislative and the Executive Council respectively for a further period of four years and five years. However, in December 1941, the Pacific War broke out suddenly and Hong Kong fell into Imperial Japan's hands after a month of resistance. Fortunately, Pollock and his wife were in Australia for health reason at the outbreak of the war, thus they were not in Hong Kong during the Japanese invasion and did not end up in Hong Kong as prisoners of war.

Although the colonial Legislative Council and Executive Council ceased to operate during the Japanese occupation of Hong Kong, Pollock was still nominally the Senior Member of the Legislative and Executive Council until the expiration of his terms in 1944 and on 8 March 1946. Pollock's final term as Senior Unofficial Member of the Executive Council traversed the Japanese occupation of Hong Kong and ended after the Liberation of Hong Kong in 1945, but in reality, he never attended any meeting of the two councils after the fall of Hong Kong. The Hong Kong Government later issued a notice in the Hong Kong Gazette in May 1946, thanking Pollock for his contribution to the colony.

The Second World War made a sudden ending to Pollock's life and public service in Hong Kong. Although he paid several visits to Hong Kong after the war, he and his wife settled permanently in Sydney after the outbreak of the Pacific War. Pollock died in Sydney on 2 February 1953, aged 88.

Family 
Pollock married his wife, Pauline Oakley in Hong Kong in 1906 when he was 42. They had no children. Lady Oakley was a long-time resident in Hong Kong and was noted for her active participation in local public services, especially in the Street Sleepers' Society, St John's Cathedral Women's Guild and the Society for the Prevention of Cruelty to Animals.

Since the outbreak of the Second Sino-Japanese War in 1937, the refugee camps in Hong Kong had also become a chief interest to Lady Pollock. In 1940, Lady Pollock, Soong Ai-ling and others initiated a campaign in Hong Kong and Canton to set up cooperatives which could accommodate 6,000 refugees to restore production. Lady Pollock was subsequently appointed an Officer of the Order of the British Empire (OBE) in the New Year Honours of 1941 for her eminent contribution.

Bibliography 
 Bill of Lading Exceptions, London: Stevens and Sons, 1894.
 Regulations for Preventing Collisions at Sea

Honours 
 J.P. (24 April 1891 )
 Gold Medal for Plague Services (1894)
 Q.C. (1900)
 Kt. (King's birthday honour list 1924)

Honorary degrees 
University of Hong Kong (Hon. LLD, 5 January 1925)

Place named after him 
 Pollock Path: a cul-de-sac on the top of Mount Gough, Hong Kong Island.

See also 
 Legislative Council of Hong Kong
 Executive Council of Hong Kong
 Attorney General (Hong Kong)
 University of Hong Kong

Footnotes

References

English materials 

 Who Was Who, London: A & C Black, 1996.
 Sir Frederick Pollock, The Will of Sir Jonathan Frederick Pollock, proved on 7 November 1870.
 "OBITUARY", THE BRITISH MEDICAL JOURNAL, 17 May 1890.
 Hong Kong Government Gazette, Hong Kong: Government Printer, 1940 – 1941.
 Great Britain Colonial Office, Corona: The Journal of His Majesty's Colonial Service version 5, London: Secretary of State for the Colonies by H. M. Stationery Office, 1953.
 Lai-bing Kan and Grace H. L. Chu, Constancy of Purpose, Hong Kong: Hong Kong University Press, 1988.
 , 8 December 2001.
 "Honour for Mr. Pollock", The China Mail, Page 1, 3 June 1924.
 "Sir H. E. Pollock, K.C., Honour for Long and Faithful Service", The China Mail, Page 5, 3 June 1924.
 "Degree Congregation. Honours Bestowed by Hong Kong University", The China Mail, Page 7, 6 January 1925.
 "The Hon. Sir Henry Pollock, Fractures Limb as Result of Fall", HONGKONG TELEGRAPH, Page 1, 18 September 1941.
 "Eight Residents in Honours List", HONGKONG TELEGRAPH, Page 8, 2 January 1941.
 Endacott, G. B., Government and people in Hong Kong, 1841–1962: A Constitutional History, Hong Kong: Hong Kong University Press, 1964.
 Oliver Lindsay, The Battle for Hong Kong 1941–1945: Hostage to Fortune, Hong Kong: Hong Kong University Press, 2005.

Chinese materials 

 張蓮興, 香港二十八總督, 朝華出版社, 1997.
 "普樂夫人等發起香港工合單位", 大公報, page 2, part 6, 13 April 1940.
 "孔祥熙夫人普樂夫人等發起香港工合單位", 香港華字日報, page 3, part 2, 13 April 1940.
 "非官議員普樂離職", 大公報, page 2, part 6, 22 September 1940.
 "普樂返港", 大公報, page 2, part 6, 28 November 1940.
 "港府昨正式發表行政局議員名單", 工商日報, page 4, 8 May 1946.

External links 
 Constancy of Purpose

1864 births
1953 deaths
Attorneys General of Hong Kong
Barristers of Hong Kong
Members of the Executive Council of Hong Kong
Members of the Legislative Council of Hong Kong
Members of the Sanitary Board of Hong Kong
Knights Bachelor
Members of the Inner Temple
People educated at Charterhouse School
Politicians from London
Lawyers from London
Attorneys General of the Colony of Fiji
Attorneys-general of Fiji
19th-century King's Counsel
20th-century King's Counsel